In June 2015, at least 102 people died after drinking contaminated alcohol in the Laxmi Nagar slum in Malad, located in Mumbai, India. Another 45 people were hospitalised as a result of the incident. The incident has been described as the worst of its kind in over a decade.

Background
Alcohol poisoning incidents are common in India, where poor people often cannot afford licensed liquor. In 2004, 104 people died after drinking contaminated alcohol in the Mumbai neighbourhood of Vikhroli.

Arrests
By 22 June 2015, seven people had been arrested, and eight police officers were suspended for negligence, in connection with the incident. The prime suspect, Mainka Bai, a woman, was absconding as of 22 June 2015. The people arrested are believed to have transported the liquor to workers and include two women: Mamta Rathod (aged 30) and Agnes Gracy alias Aunty (aged 50). Latif Khan was arrested on 23 June for his role in the distribution of the tainted beverages.

Cause
According to police, the victims suffered methanol poisoning from methanol that had been added to the liquor to increase its potency.

Reaction
The government of India has announced that it will compensate the families of the victims of the incident with 100,000 rupees, the equivalent of $1,575 in US dollars.

See also
List of alcohol poisonings in India
List of methanol poisoning incidents

References

2015 disasters in India
Alcohol-related deaths in India
History of Mumbai (1947–present)
2015 health disasters
Methanol poisoning incidents
Crime in Mumbai
Health disasters in India
June 2015 events in India